The Nyika Plateau lies in northern Malawi, with a small portion in north eastern Zambia. It towers above Lake Malawi (elevation ), and the towns of Livingstonia and Chilumba. It is very different in scenery from other parts of Malawi, consisting of rolling hills with little streams in broad valleys, and rough grassland with clumps of pine trees.

Wildlife and human settlement

It is known for its wildlife; mammals in the park include Crawshay's zebras, bushbucks, reedbucks, roan antelopes, elands, klipspringers, duikers, and warthogs. Also present are carnivores including jackals, hyenas and leopards. There are also many birds and endemic butterflies, chameleons, frogs and toads (e.g., Nyika dwarf toad), and also for its orchids.  All of the plateau is protected, by Malawi's large Nyika National Park and the much smaller Nyika National Park, Zambia. The only settlement on the plateau is Chelinda, the headquarters and accommodation site for the Malawian park.

Flora

Owing to its protected status, endemic flora continue to flourish in this part of the plateau. The flora of the plateau include gladioli, delphiniums, lobelia, and 'red hot pokers'. The plateau is also home to around 200 species of orchids. Groves of montane forests also dot the plateau.

References

Afromontane
Plateaus of Malawi
Landforms of Zambia
Plateaus of Africa
Southern Rift montane forest–grassland mosaic